The 2022 Maryland Terrapins football team represented the University of Maryland during the 2022 NCAA Division I FBS football season. The Terrapins played their home games at SECU Stadium in College Park, Maryland, and competed in the Big Ten Conference in the East Division. The team was coached by fourth-year head coach Mike Locksley and finished in fourth place in the East Division. The Terrapins defeated NC State in the Duke's Mayo Bowl to achieve their first back-to-back bowl game wins since 2002-03.

Previous season 

The Terrapins finished the 2021 season with a record of 7-6 (3-6 in the Big Ten), fifth place in the Big Ten's East Division, and as Pinstripe Bowl champions. They won their first four games, tying the team's best start since the 2016 season, but the Terrapins lost six of the next seven before winning their final two games. Maryland defeated rival West Virginia in the season opener, but fell to rival Penn State in November. The Terrapins finished 7–0 against teams with a losing record and 0–6 against teams with a winning record, with five of those losses coming against ranked teams.

Offseason

Coaching staff changes 
Head coach Mike Locksley signed a five-year, $21 million contract extension on April 29.

Defensive coordinator Brian Stewart was internally demoted after the previous season's loss to Michigan and replaced by defensive line coach Brian Williams. Maryland reached an agreement with Kevin Steele to become the Terrapins' defensive coordinator, but the deal fell apart when Steele took the same job at Miami. Stewart, who was to remain on staff as an assistant under Steele, was then fired. On February 10, Williams was officially announced as the new defensive coordinator.

Special teams coordinator Ron Zook resigned and was replaced by his former analyst James Thomas Jr.

Wide receivers coach Zohn Burden departed for the same job at Duke and was replaced by Louisville wide receivers coach Gunter Brewer.

Tight ends coach Mike Miller was promoted to co-offensive coordinator.

Recruiting class

Outgoing transfers 
31 players elected to enter the NCAA transfer portal during or after the 2021 season.

Incoming transfers 

The Terrapins added eight players from the NCAA transfer portal.

Roster

Schedule

Rankings

Game summaries

Buffalo

at Charlotte

SMU

at No. 4 Michigan

Michigan State

Purdue

at Indiana

Northwestern

at Wisconsin

at No. 14 Penn State

No. 2 Ohio State

Rutgers

vs. No. 23 NC State (Duke's Mayo Bowl)

Notes

References

Maryland
Maryland Terrapins football seasons
Duke's Mayo Bowl champion seasons
Maryland Terrapins football